Haranya Kheri railway station(Code:HKH) is one of the local railway stations in Haranya Kheri, a suburb of Indore. The Harnya Kheri station is a Flag Station where signals are not installed. The platform is not well sheltered but has four covered sheds with seating. The tickets are distributed by a vendor at the station window.

Major trains
The following trains have stoppage at the station.

See also 

 Akola–Ratlam (metre gauge trains)
 Indore Junction railway station
 Mhow railway station

References

External links 

`Project Unigauge' likely to be included in the 11th plan

Pakala-Dharmavaram BG line opened

Railway stations in Indore
Ratlam railway division
Railway stations in Indore district
Transport in Mhow